"" ("Oh my dear Papa”) is a soprano aria from the opera Gianni Schicchi (1918) by Giacomo Puccini to a libretto by Giovacchino Forzano. It is sung by Lauretta after tensions between her father Schicchi and the family of Rinuccio, the boy she loves, have reached a breaking point that threatens to separate her from Rinuccio. It provides an interlude expressing lyrical simplicity and love in contrast with the atmosphere of hypocrisy, jealousy, double-dealing, and feuding in medieval Florence. It provides the only set-piece in the through-composed opera.

The aria was first performed at the premiere of Gianni Schicchi on 14 December 1918 at the Metropolitan Opera in New York by the popular Edwardian English soprano Florence Easton. It has been sung by many sopranos. Dame Joan Hammond won a Gold Record in 1969 for 1 million sold copies of this aria.

The aria is frequently performed in concerts and as an encore in recitals by many popular and crossover singers.

Music

The vocal range extends from E4 to A5, with a tessitura of F4 to A5. The five-bar orchestral prelude, in E-flat major and  time, consists of octave tremolos by the strings; in the opera, these five bars are Gianni Schicchi's words at the end of his preceding dialogue with Rinuccio. Many recital arrangements start with a presentation of the melodic theme; the remaining accompaniment uses strings and a harp playing broken chords.

Lyrics

References

External links
 
 "O mio babbino caro" at The Aria Database
 "O mio babbino caro", score (piano and voice)
 , sung by Joan Hammond (in English as "Oh, my beloved father")
 , sung by Victoria de los Ángeles
 , sung by Elisabeth Schwarzkopf
 , sung by Maria Callas
 , sung by Montserrat Caballé
 , whistled by Woodstock in She's a Good Skate, Charlie Brown

Opera excerpts
Arias by Giacomo Puccini
1918 compositions
Soprano arias
Compositions in A-flat major